Janet Clark is an environmentalist and politician in the United Kingdom.

Living in South Ferriby, North Lincolnshire, Clark worked as a deputy headteacher.  In 1982, she joined the Ecology Party, following concerns about nitrate levels in drinking water.  At the 1989 European election, she stood in Humberside, taking 14% of the votes cast.

In 1990, she became the renamed Green Party's first member of Glanford District Council.  From 1993 until 1995, she served as a Principal Speaker of the Green Party of England and Wales.

References

Year of birth missing (living people)
Living people
Councillors in the Borough of North Lincolnshire
Green Party of England and Wales councillors
People from South Ferriby
Women councillors in England